Eri is said to be the original legendary cultural head of the Umu-eri groups of the Igbo people. Eri established a community in the middle of Anambra river valley (at Eri-aka) in Aguleri where he married two wives. The first wife, Nneamakụ, bore him five children. The first was Agulu, the founder of Aguleri (The ancestral head of Eri Kingdom clans) (the Ezeora dynasty that has produced 34 kings till date in Enugwu Aguleri), the second was Menri, the founder of Umunri / Kingdom of Nri, followed by Onugu, the founder of Igbariam and Ogbodulu, the founder of Amanuke. The fifth one was a daughter called Iguedo, who is said to have borne the founders of Nteje, and Awkuzu, Ogbunike, Umuleri, Nando and Ogboli in Onitsha. As one of the children of Eri, Menri migrated from Aguleri, which was and still is, the ancestral temple of the entire Umu-Eri (Umu-Eri and Umu-Nri). His second wife Oboli begot Ọnọja, the only son who founded the Igala Kingdom in Kogi State.

Eri is the founder of the Umueri and Umunri clans, both of whom were some of the most influential and powerful dynasties of priests and diviners in Igboland and adjacent areas such as the Bini and Igala/Idoma areas.

A Series Of Excerpts From The Oral Records Of The Igbos 
When Eri was sent by Chukwu from the sky to the earth, he sat on an ant-hill because he saw watery marshy earth. When Eri complained to Chukwu, Chukwu sent an Awka blacksmith with his fiery bellows and charcoal to dry the earth. After the assignment, the Awka blacksmith was given ọfọ as a mark of authority for his smithing profession. While Eri lived, Chukwu fed him and his people with azu-igwe. But this special food ceased after the death of Eri. Nri, one of his sons, complained to Chukwu for food. Chukwu ordered Nri to sacrifice his first son and daughter and bury them in separate graves. Nri complied with it. Later after three Igbo-weeks (12 days) yam grew from the grave of the son and coco yam from that of the daughter. When Nri and his people ate these, they slept for the first time; later still Nri killed a male and a female slave burying them separately. Again, after Izu Ato, an oil palm grew from the grave of the male slave, and a bread fruit tree (ukwa) from that of the female-slave. With this new food supply, Nri and his people ate and prospered. Chukwu asked him to distribute the new food items to all people but Nri refused because he bought them at the cost of sacrificing his own children and slaves. Nri and Chukwu made an agreement. According to M. D. W. Jeffreys (1956:123), a tradition has it that:

"As a reward for distributing food to the other towns, Nri would have the right of cleansing every town of an abomination (nso) or breach, and of tying the Ngulu (ankle cords) when a man takes the title of ozo. Also he and his successor’s would have the privilege of making the Oguji, or yam medicine, each year for ensuring a plentiful supply of yams in all surrounding towns, or in all towns that subjected themselves to the Eze Nri. For this medicine all the surrounding towns would come in and pay tribute and Umunmdri people then could travel unarmed through the world and no one would attack or harm them"  

Another legend holds that Eri was one of the seven sons of Gad, who was himself one of the twelve sons of Jacob. He left the area together with his brothers Areli and Arodi and settled in the west bank of the Niger river in the present Anambra state, where Eri had a son called Aguleri who became the father of most of the Igbo clans.

References 
The Nri Kingdom by Eze Nri, Nri Enwelana II, Obidiegwu Onyeso
Interpretive Archaeology By Julian Thomas (Google book search) 
ỤZỌ NDỤ NA EZIOKWU - Towards an Understanding of Igbo Traditional Religious Life and Philosophy by Rev. P. E. N. Onwu - 4 November 2002
Worship as Body Language By E. Elochukwu Uzukwu (Google book search) 
Foreign Missionary Background and Indigenous Evangelization in Igboland By Nkem Hyginus M. V. Chigere (Google book search)

Sources

Categories 

Igbo religion
History of Igboland
Nri monarchs
Igbo monarchs
Kingdom of Nri
African royalty
Legendary progenitors
10th-century monarchs in Africa
11th-century monarchs in Africa